William Fitz Randolph Mills (September 8, 1856 – November 16, 1941) was an American politician who served as the mayor of Denver, Colorado from 1918 to 1919.

References

Mayors of Denver
1856 births
1941 deaths